Forgiveness is the process of waiving any negative feeling or desire for punishment.

Forgiveness, Forgiven, Forgiving or Forgive may also refer to:

 Forgiveness Day or Kshamavani, the annual day of forgiveness in Jainism

Film and TV 
 "Forgiving" (Angel), a 2002 episode of Angel
 Forgiveness (2004 film), a South African film
 Forgiven (2006 film), a film directed by Paul Fitzgerald
 Forgiven (2007 film), a British TV film directed by Paul Wilmshurst
 Forgiveness (2008 film), an American dramatic Holocaust film
 Forgiven (2011 film), see List of Western films of the 2010s
 "Forgive" (The Following), a 2014 episode of The Following
 The Forgiven (2017 film), a British drama
 Forgiveness (2021 film), a Mexican-American experimental horror film
 The Forgiven (2021 film), directed by John Michael McDonagh, based on the 2012 novel

Music

Forgive 
 Forgive (album), a 2002 album by Rebecca Lynn Howard
 "Forgive" (song), this album's title track

Forgiven 
 Forgiven (album), a 2008 album by Los Lonely Boys
 "Forgiven" (Disturbed song), 2005
 "Forgiven" (Relient K song), 2006
 "Forgiven" (Sanctus Real song), 2009
 "Forgiven" (Within Temptation song), 2008
 "Forgiven" (Skillet song), 2009
 "Forgiven" (Sylver song), 2001
 "Forgiven", by Alanis Morissette from Jagged Little Pill, 1995
 "Forgiven", by Jonatha Brooke from Careful What You Wish For, 2007

Forgiveness 

 Forgiveness (album), a 2003 album by Jim Witter
 "Forgiveness" (Ayumi Hamasaki song), 2003
 "Forgiveness" (Wretch 32 song), 2011
 "Forgiveness" (Matthew West song), 2012
 "Forgiveness" (Nicky Jam song), the English version of "El Perdón" by Nicky Jam and Enrique Iglesias, 2015
 "Forgiveness" (Alice Glass song), 2018
 "Forgiveness", by Engineers from Engineers, 2005
 "Forgiveness", by Leona Lewis from Spirit, 2008
 "Forgiveness", by Paramore from After Laughter, 2017

Other 
 The Forgiven (novel), a 2012 psychological thriller by Lawrence Osborne
 FORG1VEN (born 1992), Greek professional League of Legends player